Somao is one of fifteen parishes (administrative divisions) in Pravia, a municipality within the province and autonomous community of Asturias, in northern Spain.

The population is 330 (INE 2010).

References

Parishes in Pravia